Anechura is a family of earwigs in the family Forficulidae.

Species
Species within this genus include:
 Anechura bipunctata  (Fabricius, 1781) 
 Anechura crinitata  (Shiraki, 1905) 
 Anechura filchneri  (Burr, 1908) 
 Anechura forficuliformis  Semenov & Bey-Bienko, 1935 
 Anechura globalis  Steinmann, 1990 
 Anechura harmandi  (Burr, 1904) 
 Anechura japonica  (De Bormans, 1880) 
 Anechura lewisi  (Burr, 1904) 
 Anechura lucifer  Steinmann, 1985 
 Anechura modesta  Bey-Bienko, 1959 
 Anechura nayyari  Kapoor, 1966 
 Anechura nigrescens  Shiraki, 1936 
 Anechura potanini  Bey-Bienko, 1934 
 Anechura primaria  Bey-Bienko, 1959 
 Anechura quelparta  Okamoto, 1924 
 Anechura rubicapitis  Liu, 1946 
 Anechura senator  Steinmann, 1990 
 Anechura sokotrana  Burr, 1905 
 Anechura svenhedini  Bey-Bienko, 1933 
 Anechura torquata  Burr, 1905 
 Anechura zubovskii  Semenov, 1901

References